The 2022 United States Senate election in Georgia was held on November 8, 2022, to elect a member of the U.S. Senate to represent the state of Georgia. Incumbent Democratic senator Raphael Warnock won his first full term in office, defeating Republican former football player Herschel Walker. Under Georgia's two-round system, Warnock was re-elected in a runoff election on December 6 after neither candidate received over 50% of the vote on November 8.

Warnock, who won a shortened term to the seat in a 2020–21 special election, was nominated in the May 24 primary with minimal opposition. Walker, who was endorsed by former president Donald Trump and Senate Minority Leader Mitch McConnell, won the Republican nomination with 68% of the vote. It was the first U.S. Senate election in Georgia history and among five nationwide since the passage of the Seventeenth Amendment in which both major party nominees were African American.

In the November 8 election, Warnock received 49.4% of the vote and Walker received 48.5%, triggering the December 6 runoff. Warnock defeated Walker by a 2.8% margin in the runoff and became the first African-American from Georgia elected to a full term in the U.S. Senate. Warnock's victory also secured an outright majority for Senate Democrats for the first time since 2015, with a net gain of one seat in the 2022 midterms. It was the third closest Senate election of the 2022 midterms after Nevada and Wisconsin.

Democratic primary
Warnock easily won renomination in the Democratic primary over Tamara Johnson-Shealey, a left-wing activist and businesswoman, who ran a low-profile campaign focused around reparations for slavery.

Candidates

Nominee
Raphael Warnock, incumbent U.S. Senator

Eliminated in primary
Tamara Johnson-Shealey, DeKalb County businesswoman and perennial candidate

Endorsements

Polling

Results

Republican primary

Candidates

Nominee
 Herschel Walker, former running back for the Georgia Bulldogs, former professional football player, and co-chair of the President's Council on Sports, Fitness, and Nutrition and CEO of Renaissance Man Food Services

Eliminated in primary
 Gary Black, Agriculture Commissioner of Georgia
 Josh Clark, former state representative and businessman
 Kelvin King, U.S. Air Force veteran, businessman, and founder of Osprey Management
 Jonathan McColumn, former U.S. Army Special Forces brigadier general and pastor
 Latham Saddler, former Director of Intelligence Programs on the National Security Council and former Navy SEAL officer

Declined
Christopher M. Carr, Attorney General of Georgia (ran for re-election)
Geoff Duncan, Lieutenant Governor of Georgia and former state representative
Randy Evans, former U.S. Ambassador to Luxembourg (endorsed Walker)
Vernon Jones, former Democratic state representative and CEO of DeKalb County (ran for the U.S. House in GA-10)
Brian Kemp, Governor of Georgia (ran for re-election)
Jack Kingston, former U.S. Representative for 
Kelly Loeffler, former U.S. Senator
Harold Melton, former Chief Justice of Georgia Supreme Court
David Perdue, former U.S. Senator (initially filed paperwork; ran for Governor)
David Ralston, Speaker of the Georgia House of Representatives

Debates

Endorsements

Polling
Graphical summary

Aggregate polls

Primary runoff polling
Doug Collins vs. Kelly Loeffler

Herschel Walker vs. Doug Collins

Herschel Walker vs. Kelly Loeffler

Results

Libertarian primary

Candidates

Declared
Chase Oliver, chair of the Atlanta Libertarian Party, customer service specialist, and candidate for Georgia's 5th congressional district in the 2020 special election

General election

Predictions

Debates

Endorsements

Polling
Aggregate polls

Graphical summary

Raphael Warnock vs. Gary Black

Raphael Warnock vs. Kelly Loeffler

Raphael Warnock vs. Doug Collins

Generic Democrat vs. generic Republican

Results
Despite a strong gubernatorial performance by incumbent governor Brian Kemp in his reelection bid, and leading the polls since October, Walker ended up one point behind Warnock and was forced into a runoff. Ticket splitting was evident, as Walker underperformed Brian Kemp by 200,000 votes, while Warnock did 100,000 votes better than Abrams.

Runoff 
Following the projection of incumbent Democratic senator Catherine Cortez Masto's victory in Nevada, it became clear that, unlike in the previous cycle, the results of the Georgia runoff would not determine control of the United States Senate. With all Democratic incumbents besides Warnock winning re-election and Democrat John Fetterman flipping an open seat in Pennsylvania that had been held by retiring Republican Pat Toomey, Democrats held their majority in the Senate. Nevertheless, national Democrats and Republicans began spending on advertising and volunteer mobilization efforts as soon as it became apparent that a runoff election would be necessary. Historically, runoff elections in Georgia have favored Republicans as turnout decreased disproportionately amongst Democratic voters, but in 2021, with Senate control to be determined, turnout was historically high. Prior to the runoff, elections analysts questioned whether Georgia voters would turn out in such high numbers again and tried to determine which candidate's coalition of supporters would be more likely to turn out.

The early vote window was shorter in 2022 than in 2021 due to Georgia's Election Integrity Act of 2021, which reduced the gap between general and runoff elections from nine to four weeks. State officials also said that there could be no weekend early voting: Georgia state law bars early voting from taking place the Saturday immediately before an election (December 3), and Georgia Secretary of State Brad Raffensperger argued that early voting also could not take place the next preceding Saturday (November 26), as it fell two days after Thanksgiving (November 24) and the day after a Georgia state holiday established to commemorate Confederate general Robert E. Lee's birthday (November 25). On Friday, November 18, a Fulton County Superior Court judge ruled that, despite the holidays, county boards of election could legally offer early voting on Saturday, November 26; that decision was upheld by the Georgia Court of Appeals on Monday, November 21, and by the Supreme Court of Georgia on Wednesday, November 23. Ultimately, 27 of Georgia's 159 counties chose to offer early voting on Saturday, including the state's four largest counties, Fulton, Gwinnett, Cobb, and DeKalb.

While Democrats retained control of the Senate during the 118th Congress regardless of the outcome of the Georgia runoff, Warnock's victory affected the functioning of that majority. During the 117th Congress, Senate Democrats made power-sharing agreements with Republicans, such as evenly dividing committee memberships between the two parties and giving Republicans greater ability to delay judicial appointments; with Warnock's win, Democrats attained an outright 51–49 majority, allowing them to take full control of Senate committees and expedite judicial confirmations. Looking beyond the 118th Congress, many analysts have noted that the outcome of this race will affect Democrats' prospects in the 2024 U.S. Senate elections. Election forecasters have noted that Democrats hold a number of seats up for election in 2024 which will be difficult for the party to defend, and therefore that holding Georgia's seat bolstered the party's chances to maintain Senate control going forward.

Predictions

Polling 
Aggregate polls

Graphical summary

Results

See also
2022 Georgia gubernatorial election
2022 United States House of Representatives elections in Georgia
2022 United States Senate elections
 2022 Georgia state elections

Notes

Partisan clients

References

External links
Official campaign websites
 Chase Oliver (L) for Senate
 Herschel Walker (R) for Senate
 Raphael Warnock (D) for Senate

2022
Georgia
United States Senate
African-American history of Georgia (U.S. state)